Caesium bromide or cesium bromide is an ionic compound of caesium and bromine with the chemical formula CsBr. It is a white or transparent solid with melting point at 636 °C that readily dissolves in water. Its bulk crystals have the cubic CsCl structure, but the structure changes to the rocksalt type in nanometer-thin film grown on mica, LiF, KBr or NaCl substrates.

Synthesis 
Caesium bromide can be prepared via following reactions:
 Neutralization:
 CsOH (aq) + HBr (aq) → CsBr (aq) + H2O (l)
 Cs2(CO3) (aq) + 2 HBr (aq) → 2 CsBr (aq) + H2O (l) + CO2 (g)
 Direct synthesis:
 2 Cs (s) + Br2 (g) → 2 CsBr (s)
The direct synthesis is a vigorous reaction of caesium with other halogens. Due to its high cost, it is not used for preparation.

Uses 
Caesium bromide is sometimes used in optics as a beamsplitter component in wide-band spectrophotometers.

References
* Crystran Ltd experimental data July 2021

Cited sources

External links 

 MSDS at Oxford University 
 Crystran Physical data,  IR transmission spectrum
 Ultra-violet photoabsorption measurements in alkali iodide and caesium bromide evaporated films

Caesium compounds
Alkali metal bromides
Caesium chloride crystal structure